Henri Verneuil (born Ashot Malakian; 15 October 1920 – 11 January 2002) was a French-Armenian playwright and filmmaker, who made a successful career in France. He was nominated for Oscar and Palme d'Or awards, and won Locarno International Film Festival, Edgar Allan Poe Awards, French Legion of Honor, Golden Globe Award, French National Academy of Cinema and Honorary Cesar awards.

According to one obituary:
For exactly 40 years, the prolific Verneuil made movies as mainstream and commercial as any to be found in America or Britain. In his best period – the 1950s and 1960s – he delivered films in the "tradition of quality" so despised by the Nouvelle Vague. Many of them proved excellent vehicles for old-timers Jean Gabin and Fernandel, and newcomers such as Jean-Paul Belmondo and Alain Delon.

Life and career

Early life
Verneuil was born Ashot Malakian to Armenian parents  in Rodosto, East Thrace, Turkey. In 1924, when Ashot was a little child his family fled to Marseille in France, to escape persecution after the Armenian genocide. He later recounted his childhood experience in the novel Mayrig, which he dedicated to his mother and made into a 1991 film with the same name, which was followed by a sequel, 588 Rue Paradis, the following year.

Verneuil entered the École Nationale d'Arts et Metiers in Aix-en-Provence in 1942. After graduation, he worked as a journalist, then became editor of Horizon Armenian magazine.

Film career
In 1947, Verneuil managed to convince the established European film actor Fernandel to appear in his first film.

In 1951 he directed his first feature, the black comedy La Table aux crevés. His second film, Forbidden Fruit (1952), based on a Georges Simenon novel, was even more acclaimed. 
 
Later he also directed other movie stars including Jean Gabin, Alain Delon, Lino Ventura (all together acting for him in "Le clan des siciliens" in 1969), Jean-Paul Belmondo ("Le Corps de mon ennemi" in 1976 and other films), Omar Sharif, Claudia Cardinale (Mayrig), Yves Montand and Michèle Morgan. Verneuil has filmed almost all the great figures of French cinema, with the exception of Bourvil, as even Louis de Funès has a small role in one of his films.

After the American experience (he was called the "most American of French directors"), in 1969 Verneuil "found" France. He was awarded a César in 1996 and he was elected a member of the Academy of Fine Arts in 2000. He died at Bagnolet, a suburb of Paris, in 2002.

The opening of the seventh annual Golden Apricot International Film Festival in Yerevan paid tribute to Verneuil. His son, television director Patrick Malakian, who reclaimed the name of his historical ancestors, received the posthumous award, the Parajanov's Thaler, for his father's contribution to cinema.

Filmography
 Pipe chien (1950)
 On demande un bandit (1950)
 Maldonne (1950)
 La Légende de Terre-Blanche (1950)
 L'Art d'être courtier (1950)
 Compositeurs et Chansons de Paris (1951)
  (1951) (+ screenwriter)
 Le Fruit défendu (1952) (+ screenwriter)
  (1952)
 Le Boulanger de Valorgue (1953)
 Carnaval (Carnival) (1953)
 L'Ennemi Public n°1 (Public Enemy No. 1) (1953)
 Le Mouton à cinq pattes (The Sheep Has Five Legs) (1954) (director + screenwriter)
 Les Amants du Tage (1955)
 People of No Importance (1956) (+ screenwriter)
 Paris, Palace Hotel (1956) (+ screenwriter)
A Kiss for a Killer (1957) (+ screenwriter)
 Sois belle et tais-toi (1958)
 Maxime (1958) (+ screenwriter)
 Le Grand chef (1959)
 La Vache et le Prisonnier (1959) (+ screenwriter), with Fernandel
  (1960)
 La Française et l'amour (1960)
 Le Président (The President) (1961) (+ screenwriter), with Jean Gabin
 Les Lions sont lâchés (1961)
 Un singe en hiver (1962), with Jean Gabin and Jean-Paul Belmondo
 Mélodie en sous-sol (1963) (Any Number Can Win) (1964 Edgar Award, Best Foreign Film), with Alain Delon and Jean Gabin
 Cent mille dollars au soleil (1964) (+ screenwriter), with Jean-Paul Belmondo and Lino Ventura
 Week-end à Zuydcoote (1964), with Jean-Paul Belmondo
 La Vingt-cinquième heure (The 25th Hour) (1967) (+ screenwriter), with Anthony Quinn
 La Bataille de San Sebastian (A wall for San Sebastian) (1968), with Anthony Quinn and Charles Bronson
 Le Clan des Siciliens (The Sicilian Clan) (1969) (+ screenwriter), starring Delon, Gabin and Ventura
 Le Casse (1971) (+ screenwriter), with Jean-Paul Belmondo and Omar Sharif
 Le Serpent (Night Flight from Moscow) (1973) (+ screenwriter), with Henry Fonda and Yul Brynner
 Peur sur la ville (1975) (+ screenwriter), with Jean-Paul Belmondo
 Le Corps de mon ennemi (1976) (+ screenwriter), with Jean-Paul Belmondo
 I comme Icare (I as in Icarus) (1979) (+ screenwriter), with Yves Montand
 A Thousand Billion Dollars (1982) (+ screenwriter)
 Les Morfalous (1984) (+ screenwriter), with Jean-Paul Belmondo
 Mayrig (Mother) (1992) (+ screenwriter)
 588 Rue Paradis (1993) (+ screenwriter)

References

External links

 

1920 births
2002 deaths
People from Tekirdağ
Armenians from the Ottoman Empire
Emigrants from the Ottoman Empire to France
20th-century French engineers
French film directors
Edgar Award winners
Parajanov Award winners
César Honorary Award recipients
Arts et Métiers ParisTech alumni